Dark Hollow may refer to:

 Dark Hollow, Indiana, U.S., a place
 Dark Hollow (novel) by Brian Keene, 2006
 "Dark Hollow" (Once Upon a Time), a TV episode
 "Dark Hollow" (song), by Bill Browning, 1958

See also

Dark Hollow Run (disambiguation)